The Lanark and Renfrew Scottish Regiment was an infantry regiment of the Non-Permanent Active Militia of the Canadian Militia and later the Canadian Army. First organized as the 42nd Brockville Battalion of Infantry in 1866, the regiment was later relocated to Pembroke, Ontario and Redesignated as the 42nd Lanark and Renfrew Battalion of Infantry and became a Scottish regiment in 1927. The regiment was first converted to an air defence artillery regiment in 1946 but converted back to an infantry regiment in 1959. In 1992, the regiment was again converted to artillery as the 1st Air Defence Regiment (Lanark and Renfrew Scottish), RCA (currently the 42nd Field Artillery Regiment (Lanark and Renfrew Scottish), RCA).



Lineage

The Lanark and Renfrew Scottish Regiment 

 Originated on 5 October 1866, in Brockville, Ontario, as the 42nd Brockville Battalion of Infantry.
 Redesignated on 1 December 1897, as the 42nd Lanark and Renfrew Battalion of Infantry.
 Redesignated on 8 May 1900, as the 42nd Lanark and Renfrew Regiment.
 Redesignated on 12 March 1920, as The Lanark and Renfrew Regiment.
 Redesignated on 15 July 1927, as The Lanark and Renfrew Scottish Regiment.
 Redesignated on 7 November 1940, as the 2nd (Reserve) Battalion, The Lanark and Renfrew Scottish Regiment.
 Redesignated on 15 September 1944, as The Lanark and Renfrew Scottish Regiment (Reserve).
 Converted to Air Defence Artillery on 1 April 1946, and Redesignated as the 59th Light Anti-Aircraft Regiment (Lanark and Renfrew Scottish), RCA.
 Converted to Infantry on 1 December 1959, and Redesignated as The Lanark and Renfrew Scottish Regiment.
 Converted to Air Defence Artillery on 10 November 1992, and Redesignated as the 1st Air Defence Regiment (Lanark and Renfrew Scottish), RCA (now the 42nd Field Artillery Regiment (Lanark and Renfrew Scottish), RCA).

Perpetuations 

 130th Battalion (Lanark and Renfrew), CEF
 240th Battalion, CEF

History 
On 5 October 1866, the 42nd Brockville Battalion of Infantry was authorized. Its Headquarters was at Brockville and had companies at Almonte, Brockville, Perth, Fitzroy (Kinburn), Lansdowne and Falls, Ontario.

On 24 May 1870, the battalion was called out on active service in response to the Fenian Raids. After serving on the St. Lawrence River frontier, the battalion was removed from active service on 2 June 1870.

Battalion headquarters was moved to Pembroke, Ontario on 1 December 1897. The battalion was then redesignated as the 42nd Lanark and Renfrew Battalion of Infantry.

On 8 May 1900, the battalion was eedesignated as the 42nd Lanark and Renfrew Regiment.

The First World War 
The 42nd Lanark and Renfrew Regiment was not mobilized itself for service overseas. However it contributed volunteers to the 2nd Battalion (Eastern Ontario Regiment), CEF; the 21st Battalion (Eastern Ontario), CEF; the 38th Battalion (Ottawa), CEF; the 77th Battalion (Ottawa), CEF; and the 80th Battalion, CEF.

On 22 December 1915, the 130th Battalion (Lanark and Renfrew), CEF was authorized for service and on 27 September 1916, the battalion embarked for Great Britain. After its arrival in the UK, on 6 October 1916, the battalion's personnel were absorbed by the 12th Reserve Battalion, CEF to provide reinforcements for the Canadian Corps in the field. On 21 May 1917, the 130th Battalion was disbanded.

On 15 July 1916, the 240th Battalion, CEF was authorized for service and on 3 May 1917, the battalion embarked for Great Britain. After its arrival in the UK, on 4 June 1917, the battalion's personnel were absorbed by the 7th Reserve Battalion, CEF to provide reinforcements for the Canadian Corps in the field. On 1 September 1917, the 240th Battalion was disbanded.

1920s-1930s 
On 12 March 1920, as a result of the Otter Commission and the following post-war reorganization of the militia, the 42nd Lanark and Renfrew Regiment was redesignated as The Lanark and Renfrew Regiment and was reorganized. Fromthis point it had two battalions (one of them a paper-only reserve battalion) to perpetuate the assigned war-raised battalions of the Canadian Expeditionary Force.

On 15 July 1927, the regiment was Reorganized as a Scottish unit and was Redesignated as The Lanark and Renfrew Scottish Regiment. The regiment adopted the Government (Black Watch) Tartan as part of its regimental uniform.

The Second World War

Home Defence 
On 1 September 1939, Details from The Lanark and Renfrew Scottish Regiment were mobilized for active service to provide guards for vulnerable points under the designation as The Lanark and Renfrew Scottish Regiment, CASF. On 31 December 1940, those details called out on active service were disbanded.

On 5 March 1942, the regiment subsequently mobilized the 1st Battalion, The Lanark and Renfrew Scottish Regiment, CASF. The battalion served in Canada in a home defence role as part of Atlantic Command. On 15 October 1943, the battalion was disbanded.

Italy & North-West Europe 
On 1 February 1941, the 1st Light Anti-Aircraft Regiment, RCA, CASF was organized in the United Kingdom. Serving as part of the corps troops of the I Canadian Corps, the regiment landed in Sicily on 8 November 1943 and in Italy on 8 January 1944. On 13 July 1944, as the need for more infantry was required, the regiment was converted to Infantry and Redesignated as The Lanark and Renfrew Scottish Regiment, CIC, CASF and formed part of the newly formed 12th Canadian Infantry Brigade within the 5th Canadian Armoured Division.

On 5 March 1945, the regiment moved to North-West Europe along with the rest of the I Canadian Corps as part of Operation Goldflake. After arriving in North-West Europe and with the disbandment of the 12th Canadian Infantry Brigade, on 15 March 1945, the regiment was converted back to artillery and redesignated as 1st Light Anti-Aircraft Regiment (Lanark and Renfrew Scottish Regiment), RCA, CASF and was allocated to the No. 3 Canadian Base Reinforcement Group.

On 29 June 1945, the overseas regiment was disbanded.

Organization

42nd Brockville Battalion of Infantry (5 October 1866) 

 No. 1 Company (Almonte, ON) (first raised on 5 December 1862 as the Almonte Infantry Company)
 No. 2 Company (Brockville, ON) (first raised on 11 December 1862 as the Brockville Infantry Company)
 No. 3 Company (Perth, ON) (first raised on 16 January 1863 as the Perth Infantry Company)
 No. 4 Company (Fitzroy (Kinburn), ON) (first raised on 16 January 1863 as the FitzRoy Infantry Company)
 No. 5 Company (Lansdowne, ON) (first raised on 15 June 1866 as the Lansdowne Infantry Company)
 No. 6 Company (Smith's Falls, ON) (first raised on 22 June 1866 as the Smith's Falls Infantry Company)

The Lanark and Renfrew Regiment (15 April 1922) 

 1st Battalion (perpetuating the 130th Battalion, CEF)
 2nd (Reserve) Battalion (perpetuating the 240th Battalion, CEF)

The Lanark and Renfrew Scottish Regiment (15 July 1927) 

 Regimental Headquarters (Perth, ON)
 HQ Company (Renfrew, ON)
 A Company (Pembroke, ON)
 B Company (Arnprior, ON)
 C Company (Smith's Falls, ON)
 D Company (Perth, ON)

Alliances 

  - The Black Watch (Royal Highlanders)

Battle Honours

The Great War 

 Somme, 1916
 Arras, 1917, ‘18
 Ypres, 1917
 Amiens
 Hindenburg Line
 Pursuit to Mons

The Second World War 

 Coriano
 Misano Ridge
 Casale
 Naviglio Canal
 Italy 1944-45

See also 

 Canadian-Scottish regiment

References 

Infantry regiments of Canada
Highland & Scottish regiments of Canada
Military units and formations of Ontario
Infantry regiments of Canada in World War II